Wilmot Arthur Turner (1865–1931) was an English footballer who played in the Football League for Ardwick and Stoke.

Football career
Turner started his career with his home town club Chester before moving to Football Alliance side Stoke in 1890. He scored eleven goals in the Alliance as Stoke won the title and with it were re-elected back into the Football League. Unfortunately for Turner he was not as prolific in the superior competition, scoring eight goals in two seasons. At the end of the 1892–93 he was allowed to sign for Manchester club Ardwick for whom he played once.

Professional Baseball
In 1890 Turner played professional baseball for Stoke in the National League of Baseball of Great Britain.

Career statistics
Source:

Honours
with Stoke
Football Alliance champions: 1890–91

References

English footballers
Chester City F.C. players
Manchester City F.C. players
Stoke City F.C. players
1866 births
1931 deaths
Sportspeople from Chester
English Football League players
Football Alliance players
Association football forwards
English baseball players